A serial killer is typically a person who murders three or more people, with the murders taking place over more than a month and including a significant period of time between them. The US Federal Bureau of Investigation (FBI) defines serial killing as "a series of two or more murders, committed as separate events, usually, but not always, by one offender acting alone".

Bermuda

England

Northern Ireland

Scotland

Wales

Unidentified serial killers

See also
 Lists of serial killers

References

Bibliography

 
 
 
 

serial UK

British criminals
Serial killers